is the debut single by Japanese rock singer Nana Kitade. The song was used as the first ending theme in the first Fullmetal Alchemist anime series. The single reached #14 on the Oricon Charts and stayed on the charts for a total of twenty-two weeks, selling a total of 65,525 copies.

Music video
The music video for "Kesenai Tsumi" starts out with the image of a doll version of Kitade, that is being slowly pieced together. Throughout the video are images of pale red flowers, masks floating in a bubbly space and Kitade in a black dress. At the end of the video, Kitade is shown fully human, singing against a blue backdrop with the words "Debut" and "北出菜奈" (Kitade Nana) in white text.

Track listing

Raw "Breath" Track
"Kesenai Tsumi: Raw "Breath" Track" is an acoustic rearrangement of the song. It was released a month after the original "Kesenai Tsumi". The single reached #87 and charted for eleven weeks on the Oricon Charts.

Track listing

Charts

References

External links
 Official Website Sony Music Japan

2003 singles
2003 songs
Nana Kitade songs
Fullmetal Alchemist songs
Songs written by Nana Kitade